Dubford is a small village in northern coastal Aberdeenshire, Scotland. There is evidence of prehistoric man in the vicinity of Dubford, notably from the nearby Longman Hill and Cairn Lee ancient monuments.

References

Villages in Aberdeenshire